Haplidus is a genus of beetles in the family Cerambycidae, containing the following species:

 Haplidus glabricollis Chemsak & Linsley, 1964
 Haplidus laticeps Knull, 1941
 Haplidus mandibularis Chemsak & Linsley, 1963
 Haplidus nitidus Chemsak & Linsley, 1963
 Haplidus parvulus Chemsak & Linsley, 1963
 Haplidus pubescens Chemsak & Linsley, 1964
 Haplidus testaceus LeConte, 1873

References

Hesperophanini